The 1956 Chicago White Sox season was the team's 56th season in the major leagues, and its 57th season overall. They finished with a record of 85–69, good enough for third place in the American League, 12 games behind the first place New York Yankees.

Offseason 
 October 25, 1955: Chico Carrasquel and Jim Busby were traded by the White Sox to the Cleveland Indians for Larry Doby.

Regular season

Season standings

Record vs. opponents

Opening Day lineup 
 Jim Rivera, RF
 Nellie Fox, 2B
 Larry Doby, CF
 Bob Kennedy, 3B
 Minnie Miñoso, LF
 Sherm Lollar, C
 Walt Dropo, 1B
 Luis Aparicio, SS
 Billy Pierce, P

Notable transactions 
 April 16, 1956: Carl Sawatski was purchased from the White Sox by the Toronto Maple Leafs.
 May 15, 1956: Jim Brideweser, Harry Byrd and Bob Kennedy were traded by the White Sox to the Detroit Tigers for Jim Delsing and Fred Hatfield.
 May 21, 1956: Mike Fornieles, Connie Johnson, George Kell and Bob Nieman were traded by the White Sox to the Baltimore Orioles for Dave Philley and Jim Wilson.
 May 28, 1956: Gerry Staley was selected off waivers by the White Sox from the New York Yankees.
 July 13, 1956: Morrie Martin was selected off waivers from the White Sox by the Baltimore Orioles.

Roster

Player stats

Batting 
Note: G = Games played; AB = At bats; R = Runs scored; H = Hits; 2B = Doubles; 3B = Triples; HR = Home runs; RBI = Runs batted in; BB = Base on balls; SO = Strikeouts; AVG = Batting average; SB = Stolen bases

Pitching 
Note: W = Wins; L = Losses; ERA = Earned run average; G = Games pitched; GS = Games started; SV = Saves; IP = Innings pitched; H = Hits allowed; R = Runs allowed; ER = Earned runs allowed; HR = Home runs allowed; BB = Walks allowed; K = Strikeouts

Farm system 

LEAGUE CHAMPIONS: Duluth-Superior

Notes

References 
 1956 Chicago White Sox at Baseball Reference

Chicago White Sox seasons
Chicago White Sox season
Chicago White